Eddie is a crater in the Elysium quadrangle of Mars.  It is 89 km in diameter and was named after Lindsay Eddie, a South African astronomer (1845–1913).

Impact craters generally have a rim with ejecta around them, in contrast volcanic craters usually do not have a rim or ejecta deposits.  As craters get larger (greater than 10 km in diameter) they usually have a central peak, as this crater has. The peak is caused by a rebound of the crater floor following the impact.  It contains material uplifted from beneath the surface.

The InSight Mars lander landed south and west of Eddie crater in 2018.

See also 

 Impact crater
 Impact event
 List of craters on Mars
 Ore resources on Mars
 Planetary nomenclature

References

Elysium quadrangle
Impact craters on Mars